Aspasia (after 428 BC) was a metic woman in Classical Athens.  Born in Miletus, she moved to Athens and began a relationship with the statesman Pericles, with whom she had a son, Pericles the Younger.   According to the traditional historical narrative, she worked as a courtesan and was tried for asebeia (impiety), though modern scholars have questioned the factual basis for either of these claims, which both derive from ancient comedy.  Though Aspasia is one of the best-attested women from the Greco-Roman world, and the most important woman in the history of fifth-century Athens, almost nothing is certain about her life.

Aspasia was portrayed in Old Comedy as a prostitute and madam, and in ancient philosophy as a teacher and rhetorician.  She has continued to be a subject of both visual and literary artists until the present.  From the twentieth century, she has been portrayed as both a sexualised and sexually liberated woman, and as a feminist role model fighting for women's rights in ancient Athens.

Sources

Aspasia was an important figure – and the most important woman – in the history of fifth-century Athens, and is one of the women from the Greco-Roman world with the most substantial biographical traditions.  The earliest literary sources to mention Aspasia, written during her lifetime, are from Athenian comedy, and in the fourth century BC she appears in Socratic dialogues.  After the fourth century, she appears only in brief mentions of complete texts, or in fragments whose full context is now lost, until the second century AD, when Plutarch wrote his Life of Pericles, the longest and most complete ancient biographical treatment of Aspasia.  Modern biographies of Aspasia are dependent on Plutarch, despite his writing nearly seven centuries after her death.

It is difficult to draw any firm conclusions about the real Aspasia from any of these sources: as Robert Wallace puts it, "for us Aspasia herself possesses and can possess almost no historical reality".  Aside from her name, father's name, and place of birth, Aspasia's biography is almost entirely unverifiable, and the ancient writings about her are frequently more of a projection of their own (without exception male) preconceptions than they are historical fact.  Madeleine Henry's full-length biography covers what is known of Aspasia's life in only nine pages.

Life

Early life
Aspasia was born, probably no earlier than 470 BC, in the Ionian Greek city of Miletus (in modern Aydın Province, Turkey), the daughter of a man called Axiochus.  A scholiast on Aelius Aristides wrongly claims that Aspasia was a Carian prisoner of war and a slave; this is perhaps due to confusion with the concubine of Cyrus the Younger, also called Aspasia.  The circumstances surrounding Aspasia's move to Athens are unknown.  One theory, first put forward by Peter Bicknell based on a fourth-century tomb inscription, suggests that Alcibiades of Scambonidae, the grandfather of the famous Alcibiades, married Aspasia's sister while he was in exile in Miletus following his ostracism, and Aspasia went with him when he returned to Athens.  Bicknell speculates that this was motivated by the death of Aspasia's father Axiochus in the upheaval in Miletus following its secession from the Delian League in 455/4 BC.

Life in Athens
According to the conventional understanding of Aspasia's life, she worked as a courtesan and then ran a brothel.  Some scholars have challenged this view.  Peter Bicknell notes that the "pejorative epithets applied to her by comic dramatists" are unreliable. Madeleine Henry argues in her biography of Aspasia that "we are not required to believe that Aspasia was a whore because a comic poet says she was", and that the portrayal of Aspasia as involved in the sex trade should "be looked upon with great suspicion".  Cheryl Glenn contends that Aspasia actually opened an academy for women that became "a popular salon for the most influential men of the day", including Socrates, Plato, and Pericles, and Rebecca Futo Kennedy suggests that the accusations in comedy that she was a brothel-keeper derived from this.  Despite these challenges to the traditional narrative, many scholars continue to believe that Aspasia worked as a courtesan or madam.  Konstantinos Kapparis argues that the kinds of comic attacks made on Aspasia would not have been acceptable to make about a respectable woman, and that it is therefore likely that Aspasia did have a history as a sex-worker before she began her relationship with Pericles.  Whether or not Aspasia worked as a courtesan, her later life, in which she apparently achieved some degree of power, reputation, and independence, has similarities to the lives of other prominent hetairai ("courtesans") such as Phryne.

In Athens, Aspasia met and began a relationship with the statesman Pericles.  It is uncertain how they met; if Bicknell's thesis is correct then she may have met him through his connection to Alcibiades' household.  Kennedy speculates that when Cleinias, the son of the elder Alcibiades, died at the Battle of Coronea, Pericles may have become the kurios (guardian) of Aspasia.  Aspasia's relationship with Pericles began some time between 452 and 441.  The exact nature of Pericles and Aspasia's relationship is disputed.  Ancient authors variously portrayed her as a prostitute, his concubine, or his wife.  Modern scholars are also divided. Rebecca Futo Kennedy argues that they were married; Debra Nails describes Aspasia as "the de facto wife of Pericles"; Madeleine Henry believes that Pericles' citizenship law of 451/0 made marriage between an Athenian and a metic illegal, and suggests a quasi-marital pallakia ("concubinage") enforced by contract; and Sue Blundell describes Aspasia as a hetaira and mistress of Pericles.

Aspasia and Pericles had a son, Pericles the Younger, born no later than 440/39 BC.  At the time of Pericles the Younger's birth, Pericles had two legitimate sons, Paralus and Xanthippus.  In 430/29, after the death of his two elder sons, Pericles proposed an amendment to his citizenship law of 451/0 which would have made Pericles the Younger able to become a citizen and inherit.  Though many scholars believe that this was specifically for Pericles, some have suggested that a more general exception was introduced, in response to the effect of the Plague of Athens and Peloponnesian War on citizen families.

According to Plutarch, Aspasia was prosecuted for asebeia (impiety) by the comic poet Hermippus.  She was supposedly defended by Pericles and acquitted.  Many scholars have questioned whether this trial ever took place, suggesting that the tradition derives from a fictional trial of Aspasia in a play by Hermippus.  Vincent Azoulay compares the trial of Aspasia to those of Phidias and Anaxagoras, both also connected to Pericles, and concludes that "none of the trials for impiety involving those close to Pericles is attested with certainty".

In 429 BC, Pericles died.  According to ancient sources, Aspasia then married another politician, Lysicles, and gave birth to another son, Poristes.  As "Poristes" is not otherwise known as a name – it means "supplier" or "provider", and was a euphemism for "thief" – some scholars have argued that the name comes from a misunderstanding of a joke in a comedy.  Henry doubts whether Aspasia had a child with Lysicles, and Kennedy questions whether she married Lysicles at all.  Pomeroy, however, suggests that Poristes' unusual name may have been chosen by Lysicles for political reasons, to draw attention to his providing for the people of Athens.  Lysicles died a year after Pericles, in 428, and nothing is recorded of Aspasia's life after this point.  It is unknown where or when she died.

Legacy

Ancient reception
In the classical period, two schools of thought developed around Aspasia.  One tradition, deriving from Old Comedy, emphasises her influence over Pericles and her involvement in the sex trade; the other, which can be traced back to fourth-century philosophy, concentrates on her intellect and rhetorical skill.

Comic tradition
The only surviving ancient sources to discuss Aspasia which were written during her life are from comedy.  The surviving comic tradition about Aspasia – unlike her male contemporaries – focuses on her sexuality.  Aristophanes, the only writer of Old Comedy for whom complete works survive, refers to Aspasia only once in his surviving corpus, in Acharnians.  In a passage parodying the beginning of Herodotus' Histories, Aristophanes jokes that the Megarian decree was retaliation for the kidnapping of two pornai ("prostitutes") from Aspasia.  A similar charge, attributed by Plutarch to Duris of Samos, that Aspasia was responsible for Athens' involvement in the Samian War, may have derived from this.  The mention of Aspasia's pornai in Acharnians is also the earliest known instance of the tradition that she worked as a brothel-keeper.

Outside of Aristophanes, mentions of Aspasia are known from the surviving fragments of Cratinus and Eupolis.  In a fragment of Cratinus' Cheirons, Aspasia is described as "Hera-Aspasia, a dog-eyed concubine".  Eupolis mentions Aspasia by name in three surviving fragments.  In Proslapatians, she is compared to Helen of Troy – like Aspasia, blamed for starting a war – and in Philoi to Omphale, who owned Herakles as a slave.  Eupolis also alluded to Aspasia in Demes, where Pericles, having been brought back from the dead, asks after his son; he is informed that he is alive, but is ashamed of having a porne as a mother.  Aspasia is also known to have been mentioned by Kallias, though the scholion to Plato's Menexenus which reports this is garbled and it is uncertain what Kallias said about her.  She may also have appeared in a play by Hermippus – this is possibly the source of the anecdote told by Plutarch that Aspasia was prosecuted by him for asebeia and for supplying free-born women for Pericles to have sex with.  Later authors to follow the comic tradition in focusing on Aspasia's sexuality and improper influence over Pericles, for example in Clearchus' Erotika.

Philosophical tradition

In the fourth century, four philosophers are known to have written Socratic dialogues which feature Aspasia.  Those by Antisthenes and Plato portray her negatively, in a way resembling her portrayal in comedy; Aeschines and Xenophon show her in a more positive light.  In the dialogues by Plato, Xenophon, and Aeschines, Aspasia is portrayed as an educated, skilled rhetorician, and a source of advice for marital concerns.  Armand D'Angour has argued that Diotima, to whom Socrates attributes his understanding of love in Symposium, is based on her.  In the Hellenistic and Roman periods, some authors followed Aspasia's more positive portrayal in Socratic literature, distancing her from prostitution and situating her in a tradition of wise women.  Didymus Chalcenterus wrote about exceptional women in history in his Symposiaka, downplaying her sexuality but noting her influence on Socrates' philosophy and Pericles' rhetoric. Both Athenaeus and Maximus of Tyre report that Socrates advised Callias to have Aspasia teach his son. In Rome, Cicero and Quintillian used the conversation between Aspasia and Xenophon in Aeschines' dialogue as a good example of inductio.

Modern reception

Aspasia's earliest post-classical portrayal is in the letters of Héloïse to Abelard.  Héloïse cites Aspasia's conversation with Xenophon and his wife in Aeschines' dialogue, which she probably knew through Cicero's reference to it, and proposes Aspasia as an example for how she should live her own life.

In the late medieval and early modern periods, Aspasia appeared in several catalogues, a fashionable genre at the time.  She was included in three "medallion books", with an imagined portrait and a brief biography.  The first of these was Guillaume Rouille's Promptuarium Iconum, which derives its depiction of Aspasia from Plutarch and focuses on her relationship with Pericles; in Giovanni Angelo Canini's Iconografia, Aspasia is depicted wearing a helmet and shield.  Aspasia also featured in two catalogues of women in this period as a teacher and philosopher: in Arcangela Tarabotti's  Tirannia Paterna, which portrays her as a teacher of rhetoric, and Gilles Ménage's Historia Mulierum Philosopharum, in which Aspasia is described as teaching rhetoric to Pericles and Socrates, and philosophy to Socrates.

By the eighteenth century, Aspasia was widely enough known to be included in dictionaries and encyclopedias, where depictions of her were largely based on Plutarch.  In 1736, Jean Leconte de Bièvre published the Histoire de deux Aspasies, also based on Plutarch's depiction, which portrayed Aspasia as an educated woman and Pericles' teacher as well as his wife.  The eighteenth century also saw the first known image of Aspasia to be created by a woman, Marie Bouliard's Aspasie.  The painting depicts Aspasia with one breast bared, looking into a handheld mirror and with a scroll in her other hand.  Though the bare breast references the eroticised traditions surrounding Aspasia, Madeleine Henry argues that the portrait differs from more pornographic depictions of women, with Aspasia looking into the mirror rather than out at the viewer, and holding a scroll rather than a cosmetic object such as a comb.

In the nineteenth century, Plutarch's narrative dominated the interpretation of Aspasia in both novels and paintings.  In the visual arts, the sexualised side of Aspasia was represented by Jean-Léon Gérôme's painting Socrates Seeking Alcibiades in the House of Aspasia, but this pornographised representation was relatively uncommon.  Honoré Daumier's lithograph of Socrates at the House of Aspasia depicts Aspasia as a "lorette", an ambiguous social position which referred to "loose, vulgar or 'liberated' women".  Other artists of the period depicted an Aspasia active in public life, and interacting with the most renowned men of the period.  In Henry Holiday's painting of Aspasia on the Pnyx, she is shown with another woman at the site of the Athenian assembly, the cente of male public space in the city, while in two paintings by Nicolas-André Monsiau she is shown at the centre of discussions with celebrated Athenian intellectuals and politicians.  In Socrates and Aspasia, she converses with Socrates and Pericles; in Aspasia in Conversation with the Most Illustrious Men of Athens, Euripides, Sophocles, Plato, and Xenophon are also among those included.  In both of these paintings, Aspasia is speaking and commanding the attention of these men.  Melissa Ianetta argues that Germaine de Staël's novel Corinne models its heroine after Aspasia, placing her in the same tradition of feminine rhetorical skill.

An alternative nineteenth-century representation of Aspasia positioned her as a respectable wife. The authors Walter Savage Landor and Elizabeth Lynn Linton portrayed Aspasia as a good Victorian wife to Pericles in their novels Pericles and Aspasia and Amymone: A Romance of the Days of Pericles.  Laurence Alma-Tadema's painting Phidias and the Frieze of the Parthenon also shows Aspasia as a respectable companion to men.  By contrast, Robert Hamerling's novel Aspasia showed her as a proto-feminist with far more agency than these romanticised accounts.

The twentieth century saw on the one hand increasing interest in Aspasia separately from her relationships with men, and on the other more prurient concern with her sexuality.  The former strand of Aspasia's reception saw the Latvian author, feminist, and politician Elza Rozenberga, who took the pseudonym Aspazija, model her campaigning for women's rights after what she saw as Aspasia's example.  Aspasia was also taken as a feminist role-model by Judy Chicago, who included her as one of the thirty-nine women given a place in her artwork The Dinner Party.  Recent novels have tended towards the more explicitly sexualised portrayal of Aspasia, including Achilles His Armour by the classicist Peter Green, Madelon Dimont's Darling Pericles, and Taylor Caldwell's Glory and Lightning, in which Aspasia is raised as a courtesan.  The 2018 video game Assassin's Creed Odyssey, which features Aspasia in a major role, follows the ancient tradition which portrayed her as a hetaira.  She is depicted as using her femininity to gain political power by manipulating men and through her connections to other women across the Greek world.

Notes

References

Bibliography
 
 
 
 
 
 
 
 
 
 
 
 
 
 
 
 
 
 
 
 

470s BC births
400s BC deaths
5th-century BC Athenians
5th-century BC Greek women
5th-century BC philosophers
Ancient Athenian women
Ancient Greek rhetoricians
Ancient Greek women philosophers
Ancient Milesians
Conversationalists
Greek female prostitutes
Hetairai
Metic philosophers in Classical Athens
Philosophers of ancient Ionia
Rhetoric

Year of birth uncertain
Year of death unknown